The Christopher Columbus Monument was a marble statue of the explorer Christopher Columbus in the Little Italy neighborhood of Downtown Baltimore, Maryland. The monument was brought down by protesters and dumped into the Inner Harbor on July 4, 2020, one of numerous monuments removed during the George Floyd protests. The statue is being reproduced by the Knights of Columbus.

Description

The marble sculpture depicted Christopher Columbus. The memorial included a marble base featuring the three ships of the Columbus fleet: the Niña, the Pinta, and the Santa María. It bore the inscription "Discoverer of America."

History
The Christopher Columbus Monument was the newest of Baltimore's three monuments dedicated to the explorer Christopher Columbus.  Located in Columbus Piazza, the sculpture was designed by Mauro Bigarani and was commissioned by donations from the Italian American Organization United of Maryland and the Italian American community of Baltimore. The statue was unveiled by then-Mayor William Donald Schaefer and President Ronald Reagan in October 1984.

Vandalism and destruction
On Independence Day 2020, a group of protestors gathered at the piazza to remove the statue by lassoing the top of the monument, according to footage of the event.  The monument subsequently fell to the ground and broke into fragments.  The protesters continued by rolling the body of the statue into the Jones Falls canal of the Baltimore Harbor.

The event came days before a warning made by the organization known as the Baltimore BLOC that the group would be destroying the monument if the city did not take upon the action themselves. Afterwards, Baltimore BLOC celebrated and applauded their "kinfolk" involved in the statue's destruction.

During the days leading up to the statue's demise, former State Senator John Pica attempted to raise funds for the statue's relocation, which was estimated to be approximately $100,000. On June 26, 2020 supporters of the monument, including state delegates Nino Mangione and Kathy Szeliga as well as state senator Johnny Salling, gathered to promote keeping the monument as it stands.

As with many of the recent monument removals across America, reactions were mixed.  Governor Larry Hogan denounced the vandalism and instead encouraged having a "constructive dialogue" regarding monument removal. Mayor Jack Young commented that the statue's destruction was "part of a national and global reexamination over monuments".

Future
The statue was fished out of the river by the Knights of Columbus. The statue had broken into 12 pieces and it was determined to be unsalvageable, however the Knights of Columbus stated they would reproduce the statue. In October it was revealed that the statue mold was being produced. It was estimated to cost $80-85,000, and that they had raised nearly half the funds at that point. It will not return to its original spot. In November the National Endowment for the Humanities announced that they would give $30,000 to the Knights of Columbus to help assist with the recreation of the statue, along with three others.

See also

 List of monuments and memorials removed during the George Floyd protests
 List of monuments and memorials to Christopher Columbus
 List of public art in Baltimore

References

External links
 Video of the vandalism by The Telegraph

1984 establishments in Maryland
1984 sculptures
Destroyed sculptures
Knights of Columbus
Little Italy, Baltimore
Marble sculptures in the United States
Monuments and memorials in Maryland
Monuments and memorials removed during the George Floyd protests
Outdoor sculptures in Baltimore
Presidency of Ronald Reagan
Riots and civil disorder in Baltimore
Sculptures of men in Maryland
Baltimore
Vandalized works of art in Maryland
Statues removed in 2020
National Endowment for the Humanities